Katozai is a town and union council of Charsadda District in Khyber Pakhtunkhwa province of Pakistan. It is located at 34°16'54N 71°35'53E and has an altitude of 327 metres (1076 feet). Here many tribes of Puktoons are settled like Yousafzai, Akhunzada, Mehmod Kheil, Sardar Kheil, Chawar Kheil, Pasand Kheil, Utman Kheil etc. Mehmod 

Union councils of Charsadda District
Populated places in Charsadda District, Pakistan